Francis "Buzz" Watson is a fictional character appearing in TNT's two shows, The Closer and Major Crimes, and portrayed by Phillip P. Keene. He serves as a Civilian Service Coordinator, providing technical support to the Los Angeles Police Department's Major Crimes Division. His duties include filming crime scenes, and he runs the audio and video systems in the interrogation room with what he states in Rusty Beck's video blog Identity are his own cameras. He later starts training as a Reserve Officer in season 3 of Major Crimes and has started to take up those duties as well in season 4. By the beginning of season 6, Buzz has become a Reserve Detective and has started to take a more active role in investigations. In the final scene of the series, Lieutenant Provenza arranges for Buzz to attend the police academy for eighteen weeks. Upon Buzz's return, he will be a probationary detective within the Major Crimes Division.

In The Closer 
The character Buzz Watson first appeared in the second episode of the first season, "About Face". Originally a recurring role, as the series progressed the character's visibility increased until Buzz became one of the central characters. In the season 1 episode "Standards and Practices", it was revealed that he speaks fluent Spanish, which he learned from his Mexican stepfather. In the season 7 episode "You Have the Right to Remain Jolly", it was revealed he had a sister named Casey, who was played by Christine Woods.

In Major Crimes 
The character of Buzz Watson is a main/regular character on Major Crimes.

In many first season episodes, he was bothered by being assigned the role of watching over Rusty Beck to allow Rusty's guardian, Sharon Raydor, to focus on work.   Through the season, Buzz came to accept Rusty and treated him like a younger brother, acting as a mentor to the teenager.  He tutors Rusty when he's removed from school due to Wade Weller's threats.  In season four, when Rusty is frustrated by his inability to find a story for his burgeoning journalism career, Buzz uses subtle hints to guide Rusty into doing investigative reporting on Alice Herrera, a homeless girl who was murdered and never identified.  After helping Rusty with his efforts, generally by acting as his cameraman, leading to the girl's proper identification, Buzz joins the squad at her funeral.

In season two episode "Risk Assessment", Buzz explains to Rusty that he became interested in police work when his father and uncle were murdered in a robbery. He wanted to become a police officer to track down their killer but his mother was afraid of losing him too so he went to film school instead and became the LAPD's Civilian Surveillance Coordinator instead of a police officer.  He's later trained as a Reserve Officer during season three and went on his first ride-along in season four episode "Turn Down", where he ends up discovering an apparent suicide is in fact a murder. Buzz then aids the squad in catching the killer both as a Reserve Officer and in his usual role. However, Buzz catching the murder leaves Flynn and Provenza annoyed as it causes them to miss a major Fourth of July Dodgers game. When asked, Provenza gives him a good score but with room for improvement as he made them miss a baseball game. He has recently started going for Reserve Detective.

In the season five opener "Present Tense", Buzz begins looking into the murders of his father and uncle to fulfill the vow he made to himself when he was eleven and catch their killers. While Provenza removes some of the more graphic pictures from the murder book, Buzz insists on seeing them and tells everyone he doesn't want this to be the way their story is told. To this end, Buzz agrees to let his tragedy and search for justice to be the next story in Rusty's Identity segment entitled The Long Shadow which they start by going back to the scene of the crime where Buzz describes what happened before explaining to Rusty's audience that the victims were his father and uncle. With the help of the squad, Buzz gets the ATM security tape cleaned up and focuses on his search on a partial fingerprint left behind on his father's ATM card. After a suggestion from Provenza, Buzz began searching through similar unsolved ATM robberies for matching partials to try to identify the man who left the partial and in The Long Shadow Part 6 has had some luck, finding another partial that matches the one on the ATM card. In "Family Law", through identifying a witness and not a suspect, Buzz is able to use his partials to identify one of the men from the robbery, Gene Hecht who is serving a life sentence and whose known crimes include an ATM robbery three miles from where Buzz's father and uncle were murdered. Buzz begins the process of having Gene transferred in an attempt to gain his cooperation in identifying his accomplice, the man who was the actual killer. In "Dead Zone", Buzz interrogates Gene who gives him an alibi. In the following episode, Buzz questions the woman who not only breaks Gene's alibi but gives more proof towards his guilt as Gene was wearing a rare watch the day after the murder that had been taken from Buzz's uncle. With this statement, Buzz is able to get Gene to give up the name of his father and uncle's killer, Bill Jones and identify him in "White Lies, Part 2." In "White Lies, Part 3", Buzz uses social media to identify a possible suspect for the Bill Jones he's looking for. Due to some amateur detective work, Rusty is able to get Buzz Bill's fingerprints, enabling him to confirm the suspect's identity. Accompanied by Provenza and several police officers, Buzz travels to Bill Jones' home where he discovers the man has a wife and kids, leaving Buzz uneasy. After allowing Bill to say goodbye to his family, Buzz personally arrests the man for the murders of his father and uncle. Buzz later tells Rusty and his boyfriend Gus that Bill confessed to the murders and the DA is working up a deal of life in prison without parole. However, Buzz is disturbed as Bill had two kids of his own and in arresting him, Buzz left two children fatherless as Bill did to him and his sister. In the final segment of Identity, Buzz states that Gene Hecht and Bill Jones both confessed in open court to the murders of his father and uncle and took deals that gives Hecht another life sentence in the prison he was already incarcerated in and Bill Jones gets life in prison without parole in a prison near his family. In "Heart Failure", Buzz receives a letter from Bill's son Gabe asking for Buzz to forgive Bill so he can return to his family. Buzz is left distressed as Gabe expresses that his father deeply regrets his actions and his arrest is destroying their family. Over the remainder of the season, Buzz keeps in close contact with Bill's family despite the squad's reservations about it.

In "Sanctuary City, Part 1," Buzz has become a Reserve Detective and takes an active role in an investigation on Sharon's request due to Julio being on bereavement leave. Along with continuing to monitor interrogations, Buzz performs one of his own, joins Provenza in an official capacity in visiting a hostile neighbor, though he carries his camera in case the man's daughter will talk to them and leads a search of one of the victim's houses. While leading this search, Buzz's understanding of Spanish allows he and his team to locate a million dollars the victim's parents are trying to hide as they are unaware Buzz can understand them talking about where they don't want the police to search. After Julio's early return in "Sanctuary City, Part 3," a visibly disappointed Buzz resumes his usual role though he continues to help with the case by finding evidence they can use against Marvin Garret.

Shortly before her death in "Conspiracy Theory, Part 4," Sharon borrows Buzz's camera to record final messages to her family. Aware that she does not have much longer to live, Sharon leaves the messages and instructions to not give them to her family until a week after her funeral with Buzz. After Phillip Stroh is revealed to have indeed returned in "By Any Means, Part 1," Buzz gives out the messages early. In particular, Buzz gives Rusty his private message from Sharon and urges Rusty to view it in light of the threat from Stroh.

In the "By Any Means" arc, Buzz takes on a greater role in the investigation into Phillip Stroh's renewed murder spree. In "By Any Means, Part 3," Buzz realizes that Major Crimes has been hacked and discreetly alerts the others. Buzz joins the meeting with Assistant Chief Mason and argues for laying a trap for Stroh's accomplice, Dylan Baxter despite Buzz acknowledging that he usually just "turns things on and off around here." To the surprise of everyone, Mason asks for Buzz's opinion over Tao's after Buzz speaks up and agrees with the argument that Buzz presents for laying a trap and the low risks it has. In "By Any Means, Part 4," while the rest of the LAPD is surrounding the airport Stroh is supposedly fleeing the country from, Rusty insists upon checking on Tammy Bechtel, Stroh's ex-stepsister. With no other backup available, Provenza reinstates Buzz as a Reserve Detective and has Buzz act as his backup. In the process, Provenza has Buzz break down the woman's front door, but he does the worst job of it that Provenza has ever seen. Armed with a gun, Buzz helps to clear the Bechtel home and finds Tammy's body. However, in order to get a chance to kill Stroh, Provenza orders Buzz not to call in the murder yet and to remain behind with his camera, timestamp off, to record the murder scene.

In the final scene of Major Crimes, Provenza announces to Buzz at Julio's promotion ceremony that he has arranged for Buzz to attend the police academy for the next eighteen weeks. When Buzz returns, he will be a probationary detective and a full member of the squad instead of officially being their Civilian Surveillance Coordinator. Provenza jokes to an excited Buzz that he did it just to keep Buzz from quoting his Reserve Detective classes anymore.

References 

Television characters introduced in 2005
Fictional Los Angeles Police Department officers
The Closer characters